Chen Xingtong (simplified Chinese: 陈幸同; born 27 May 1997) is a Chinese table tennis player.

Singles titles

References

Chinese female table tennis players
1997 births
Living people
Table tennis players from Shenyang
Asian Games medalists in table tennis
Table tennis players at the 2018 Asian Games
Asian Games gold medalists for China
Medalists at the 2018 Asian Games
World Table Tennis Championships medalists